Hitesh Anadkat is a Malawi-based businessman, investor and philanthropist. He is the founder of the African banking group FMB Capital Holdings.

Early life and education 
Anadkat was born at the Queen Elizabeth Central Hospital in Blantyre, Malawi in 1960 when the country was still under British colonial rule. His father, NG Anadkat was a prominent businessman in Malawi. He is of Indian descent and holds a British passport. Anadkat has a Bachelor of Science (Economics) degree from the University of London and a Master's in Business Administration from Cornell University. He is married to Meeta. Together, they have three children.

Career 
After completing his education, Anadkat worked in the United States, eventually starting his own corporate finance firm in Connecticut. He returned to Malawi in 1992. In 1994, Anadkat was granted the first private banking licence in Malawi. He has stated that he did not expect to be granted a banking licence, since the financial sector had been closed and largely state-controlled until that point.

In 1995, he established First Merchant Bank (now known as First Capital Bank). The bank proved successful early on, and has since expanded into other countries. In 2008, First Capital Bank was granted a banking licence in Botswana. In 2013, First Capital Bank purchased the Mozambique, Malawi and Zambia banking operations of International Commercial Bank (ICB). In 2017, the group purchased a majority-stake in Barclays Bank of Zimbabwe.

The shares of First Capital Bank were transferred to a Mauritian-based entity, FMB Capital Holdings in 2017. Its shares trade on the Malawi Stock Exchange. In 2021, its assets stood at $1.4 billion. Anadkat remains its principal shareholder, and serves as a non-executive board member of FMB Capital and its subsidiaries.

In 2007, Anadkat was a key player in the consortium that bought Malawi's largest telecoms provider TNM from Telekom Malaysia, along with Press Corporation and Old Mutual. Anadkat owns a significant minority stake in the company, and served as its Vice Chairman from 2007 to 2021.

In 2021, he became the largest private shareholder of Botswana-based financial services provider Letshego. His other interests include tobacco, manufacturing and real estate. His real estate portfolio includes the landmark Livingstone Towers in Blantyre and Chief M’Mbelwa Building in Malawi's capital city, Lilongwe.

Philanthropy 
Anadkat and his family have been noted for their large philanthropic contributions in Malawi. His projects have primarily been in the health, education and prison reform sectors. Among his notable donations are the Anadkat Hostel at the University of Malawi College of Medicine, the Anadkat-Wellcome Trust Adult Emergency and Trauma Centre at Malawi's largest hospital, Queen Elizabeth Central Hospital and the Children's ward at the same hospital.

Anadkat has also been involved in prison reform. He has publicly decried prison conditions and congestion in Malawi and faulted magistrates for giving disproportionately large sentences to minor offenders. In 2020, he constructed the largest prison block in the Malawi Prison Services at the Chichiri Prison in Blantyre.

References 

Malawian businesspeople
Living people
1960 births
Cornell University alumni